Hoo Cha-pen (c. 1924 – 17 April 2004) was a Taiwanese basketball player and coach. He was born in Hubei, China and graduated from the Department of Education of Anhui University. He competed as part of the Republic of China's squad at the 1956 Summer Olympics, and later served as head coach of the Republic of China men's basketball team.

References

External links
 

1920s births
2004 deaths
Taiwanese men's basketball players
Olympic basketball players of Taiwan
Basketball players at the 1956 Summer Olympics
Asian Games medalists in basketball
Basketball players at the 1954 Asian Games
Basketball players at the 1958 Asian Games
Asian Games silver medalists for Chinese Taipei
Medalists at the 1954 Asian Games
Medalists at the 1958 Asian Games
Anhui University alumni
Basketball players from Hubei
Taiwanese people from Hubei
Chinese men's basketball players
1959 FIBA World Championship players
1954 FIBA World Championship players
Republic of China men's national basketball team players